Chlosyne is a genus of butterflies from North and South America in the family Nymphalidae.

Species
Listed alphabetically within groups:

The lacinia species group:
 Chlosyne californica (Wright, 1905) – California patch 
 Chlosyne definita (Aaron, [1885]) – definite patch 
 Chlosyne ehrenbergii (Geyer, 1833) – white-rayed checkerspot, white-rayed patch
 Chlosyne endeis (Godman & Salvin, 1894) – banded checkerspot, banded patch
 Chlosyne erodyle (Bates, 1864) – erodyle checkerspot, Guatemalan patch
 Chlosyne janais (Drury, [1782]) – Janais patch, crimson patch
 Chlosyne gaudialis (Bates, 1864) – gaudy checkerspot, gaudy patch
 Chlosyne hippodrome (Geyer, 1837) – simple checkerspot, simple patch
 Chlosyne lacinia (Geyer, 1837) – bordered patch, sunflower patch
 Chlosyne marina (Geyer, 1837) – marina checkerspot, red-spotted patch
 Chlosyne melanarge (Bates, 1864) – black checkerspot, cream-banded checkerspot, black patch
 Chlosyne narva (Fabricius, 1793) – Narva checkerspot
 Chlosyne rosita Hall, 1924 – Rosita patch

The Charidryas species group:
 Chlosyne acastus (Edwards, 1874) – sagebrush checkerspot
 Chlosyne gabbii (Behr, 1863) – Gabb's checkerspot
 Chlosyne hoffmanni (Behr, 1863) – aster checkerspot, Hoffmann's checkerspot
 Chlosyne palla (Boisduval, 1852) – northern checkerspot 
 Chlosyne whitneyi (Behr, 1863) – rockslide checkerspot
 Chlosyne whitneyi damoetas (Skinner, 1902)

The harrisii species group:
 Chlosyne harrisii (Scudder, 1864) – Harris's checkerspot
 Chlosyne gorgone (Hübner, 1810) – gorgone crescentspot 
 Chlosyne nycteis (Doubleday, [1847]) – silvery crescentspot

The Thessalia species group:
 Chlosyne chinatiensis (Tinkham, 1944) – Chinati checkerspot
 Chlosyne cyneas (Godman & Salvin, 1878) – Cyneas checkerspot, black checkerspot
 Chlosyne leanira (C. & R. Felder, 1860) – leanira checkerspot
 Chlosyne theona (Ménétriés, 1855) – Theona checkerspot

Uncertain grouping:
 Chlosyne fulvia (Edwards, 1879) – Fulvia checkerspot
 Chlosyne kendallorum Opler, 1999 – Kendall's checkerspot, Nuevo León checkerspot

References

Explanation of Synonymity

 
Butterflies of North America
Melitaeini
Nymphalidae of South America
Butterfly genera
Taxa named by Arthur Gardiner Butler